Lost Girl is a Canadian supernatural drama television series that premiered on Showcase on September 12, 2010. The series was created by Michelle Lovretta and is produced by Jay Firestone and Prodigy Pictures Inc., with the participation of the Canadian Television Fund (Canada Media Fund), and in association with Shaw Media. It follows the life of a bisexual succubus named Bo, played by Anna Silk, as she learns to control her superhuman abilities, help those in need, and discover the truth about her origins.

On December 9, 2011, Showcase announced that Lost Girl had been renewed for a third season. Season Three premiered on January 6, 2013.

In Australia, Season Three premiered on SF (formerly Sci Fi) on January 10, 2013.  In the United States, Season Three premiered on Syfy on January 14, 2013.  In the United Kingdom and Ireland, Season Three premiered on Syfy (UK) on April 23, 2013.

Plot

With Fae society in upheaval, Bo finds herself facing further changes and challenges as former ally Hale becomes the acting Ash – trying to forge a new balance between Light and Dark by appointing a Valkyrie aligned with the Dark Fae, Tamsin, as Dyson's new detective partner. Meantime, Tamsin is a secret agent working for two separate clients: The Morrigan, who wants to build a case against Bo so that she can execute her; and as a mercenary for someone who wants to entrap Bo. Matters become complicated when Kenzi is kidnapped by a crazed Kitsune who assumes her identity and deliberately sows distrust in the relationships between Bo and those closest to her; just as Bo must prepare for and go through an evolutionary Fae rite of passage that forces her to explore her past and future. Danger escalates when a human scientist convinces a despondent Lauren to join him in conducting scientific research in his private laboratory – all the while deceptively concealing his intent to harness Fae genetics for himself with the use of her expertise. The third season culminates with Bo being engulfed by black smoke and disappearing into thin air, presumably whisked away by her mysterious and powerful biological father (who may be "The Wanderer" that recurred throughout the season's story arc).

Cast and characters

Main cast 
 Anna Silk  as Bo
 Kris Holden-Ried  as Dyson
 Ksenia Solo  as Kenzi
 Zoie Palmer  as Dr. Lauren Lewis 
 Rick Howland  as Fitzpatrick "Trick" McCorrigan
 K. C. Collins  as Hale Santiago

Recurring cast
 Emmanuelle Vaugier as Evony Fleurette Marquise: The Morrigan.
 Paul Amos as Vex: a Mesmer.
 Rachel Skarsten as Tamsin: a Valkyrie.
 Shawn Doyle as Dr. Isaac Taft: a psychotic human scientist and Fae hunter.
 Deborah Odell as Stella Nashira: a Lodestar.
 Rob Archer as Bruce: a bodyguard and hatchet man for The Morrigan (species unknown).
 Inga Cadranel as Aife: a Succubus and Bo's birth mother.
 Tim Rozon as Massimo: The Druid.

Production
Naming Lost Girl its "highest rated drama series", Showcase announced the renewal for a third season on December 9, 2011, with production beginning in Spring 2012.

Prodigy Pictures announced the start of principal photography on Season Three on April 17, 2012, with the season premiere slated for Fall 2012.

On July 12, 2012, Showcase announced Season Three would premiere in Winter 2013 (i.e. early 2013).

Syfy confirmed the January 14, 2013, U.S. premiere of Season Three in a general press release on November 12, 2012. The following day (November 13), Showcase announced the Canadian premiere date of January 6, 2013.

Broadcast special
Lost Girl ConFAEdential, a special roundtable discussion about the previous two seasons and characters, aired on Showcase before the premiere of Season Three on January 6, 2013. Moderated by Jay Firestone, Executive Producer of Lost Girl, it featured (in order of introduction): Rick Howland ("Trick"), Zoie Palmer ("Dr. Lauren Lewis"), Anna Silk ("Bo"), Kris Holden-Ried ("Dyson"), Ksenia Solo ("Kenzi"), and K.C. Collins ("Hale").

Episodes

Notes

Season 3.5
See Lost Girl (season 4)#Webisodes

Reception and popularity 
"Bo and Lauren" was named Top TV Couple of 2013 by E! Online (E! Entertainment Television), with its competition in the annual popularity contest compared to a "David versus Goliath".

On February 14, 2013, a CNN (Cable News Network) broadcast of the twenty, past and present, favorite couples in  television included "Bo and Lauren" as couple "Number 9" in the list.

"Lauren Lewis" was chosen "Number 1" by AfterEllen in its November 2013 survey of The Top 25 Lesbian/Bi Characters on TV (Right Now). "Bo" was named "Number 7" in the list.

Home media release
The DVD and Blu-ray of Season 3 was released by Giant Ape Media (Funimation SC) in Region 1 (Canada and U.S.) on November 19, 2013. In Australia (Region 4), Sony Pictures Home Entertainment released the DVD of Season 3 on December 5, 2013.  In the United Kingdom and Ireland (Region 2), Sony Pictures Home Entertainment released the Season 3 DVD on March 3, 2014.

References

External links
 
 Lost Girl at  Syfy (U.S.) 
  Lost Girl at Prodigy Pictures Inc.  
 Lost Girl at Canadian Television Fund  
 
 
 Lost Girl list of episodes at Garn's Guides
 Lost Girl at BO SERIES INC. (Giant Ape Media)

Season
2013 Canadian television seasons